Alex McRae or Alexander McRae or MacRae may refer to:
 Alexander McRae (explorer) (1844–1888), Australian explorer, pastoralist and entrepreneur
 Alexander McRae (1829–1862), U.S. Army officer killed in the Battle of Valverde
 Alexander MacRae (c. 1888–1938), Scottish-Australian entrepreneur
 Alexander Duncan McRae (1874–1946), Canadian businessman

See also